Shoeb Kagda is an Indonesian journalist and businessman. Kagda completed his BA degree at Indiana University, in Bloomington, United States, graduating with a double major in Journalism and Political Science.

Journalism career
He started his career in economic journalism in 1988 as a reporter for the Singapore Business Times. He moved to Jakarta in 1998 to cover the Asian financial crisis during which time he wrote on the political and economic climate of Indonesia.

Publishing
In 2007, he launched Globe Asia, which annually publishes the 150 Richest Indonesians and the 100 Top Companieslists. The magazine today has a circulation of 60,000.

Media business
After serving as the Group Editor in Chief for BeritaSatu Media Holdings (which includes Globe Asia, the Jakarta Globe, Investor Daily) for three years, Kagda started a media and political consulting firm, Synthesis Indonesia, in 2013.

Forum
In 2014, he established the Indonesia Economic Forum, a forum in which businesses, economists and government officials can discuss Indonesian economic affairs.

References

Date of birth missing (living people)
Living people
Indonesian businesspeople
Indonesian people of Arab descent
Indiana University Bloomington alumni
Indonesian company founders
Year of birth missing (living people)